"White, White Dove" is a song by the British rock band Steve Harley & Cockney Rebel, which was released in 1976 as the second and final single from their fourth studio album Timeless Flight. The song was written and produced by Harley.

Background
As the second single to be released from Timeless Flight, "White, White Dove" followed the commercial failure of "Black or White", which failed to enter the UK Singles Chart when released in November 1975. "White, White Dove" was released shortly after Timeless Flight, but despite the album's top 20 success in the UK, "White, White Dove" also failed to reach the UK top 50. It did however reach number six in the BMRB's UK Breakers Chart on 13 March 1976, which would have been equal to number 56 in the UK Singles Chart at a time when the national chart only ran to the top 50.

"White, White Dove" was recorded at Trident Studios in London, and remixed and cut at Abbey Road Studios, London. The song features Lindsay Elliott, the younger brother of the band's drummer Stuart Elliott, on congas.

Release
"White, White Dove" was released by EMI Records as a 7-inch single in the UK, Germany, Belgium, Portugal and Australia. Some versions of the single featured an edit of "White, White Dove", which cut the album version down by over a minute.

The single's B-side, "Throw Your Soul Down Here", was written and produced by Harley. It was exclusive to the single and remained so until it was included as a bonus track on the 1991 EMI CD release of Timeless Flight. The song was recorded at AIR Studios, London, after the Timeless Flight sessions. It features Herbie Flowers on double bass and B. A. Robertson on piano.

Promotion
To promote the song's release as a single, the band performed the song live on the UK ITV music programme Supersonic. The performance has surfaced on YouTube in recent years.

Critical reception
On its release as a single, Ray Fox-Cumming of Record Mirror & Disc predicted the song would be a hit. He commented, "I was not convinced that this was the best track to be single number two from Timeless Flight, but now, edited down, it does make sense. It's still not one of Harley's strongest songs, but the funky guitar patterns, well-paced vocal and sterling production all help to make it man enough for the job of chart-breaching." Caroline Coon of Melody Maker was positive of the song in her review, but felt it had "less chart potential" than "Black or White". She wrote, "This is a subtly different mix from the album track. Slightly edgier, just emphasising the anger which gapes like an infinite black pit under the funky, wildly ecstatic percussion and popping bass lines. Not only is this sound supremely confident, swimming straight up the current Seventies feel, pitched right on the pulse of what is relevant in music today, but Harley's whole tone is thrusting forward in the direction to where sound will be in the Eighties."

Roxana Read of the Neath Guardian commented, "Bearing olive  branches, peace and contentment, Harley is back with 'White, White Dove'. Perhaps this one will get no further than 'Black or White'. Certainly not a 'Judy Teen'. Excellent, though." In a review of Timeless Flight, Stewart Parker, for his "High Pop" column in The Irish Times criticised the song for being "aimless and tuneless". Graham Scott of The Evening Times (Little Falls, New York), considered the song to be musically similar to the Rolling Stones' "Sympathy for the Devil". He added, "What it's all about I'm not sure, but the music's certainly good." In a 2003 review of Timeless Flight, Martin Aston of Q felt the song's "borderline-poppy chorus is scuppered by skittish, borderline-jazz rock flourishes".

Track listing
7-inch single
"White, White Dove" – 5:37
"Throw Your Soul Down Here" – 4:04

7-inch single (Australian release)
"White, White Dove" (Edited Version) – 4:15
"Throw Your Soul Down Here" – 4:04

Personnel
White, White Dove
 Steve Harley – vocals, guitar
 Jim Cregan – guitar, backing vocals
 Duncan Mackay – keyboards
 George Ford – bass, backing vocals
 Stuart Elliott – drums
 Lindsay Elliott – congas

Throw Your Soul Down Here
 Steve Harley – vocals, acoustic guitar
 Herbie Flowers – double bass
 B. A. Robertson – piano
 Stuart Elliott – drums
 Yvonne Keeley – backing vocals

Production
 Steve Harley – producer
 Peter Kelsey – engineer on "White, White Dove"
 Tony Clark – engineer and remix engineer on "White, White Dove"
 Chris Blair – mastering on "White, White Dove"

Charts

References

1976 songs
1976 singles
Steve Harley songs
Songs written by Steve Harley
EMI Records singles